Six Monk's Compositions (1987) is an album by American saxophonist and composer Anthony Braxton recorded in 1987 for the Italian Black Saint label. The album features Braxton's interpretations of compositions by Thelonious Monk.

Reception
The AllMusic review by Thom Jurek awarded the album 4½ stars stating "From the jump, the listener can tell this is no ordinary Monk tribute. The music is fast, skittering along at a dervish's pace... radically reinterpreted, played and executed with a degree of musicianship seldom found on any tribute".

Track listing
All compositions by Thelonious Monk
 "Brilliant Corners" – 9:24 
 "Reflections" – 4:58 
 "Played Twice" – 6:51 
 "Four in One" – 9:41 
 "Ask Me Now" – 6:35 
 "Skippy" – 6:43
Recorded at Barigozzi Studio in Milano, Italy on June 30 and July 1, 1987

Personnel
Anthony Braxton – alto saxophone 
Mal Waldron – piano
Buell Neidlinger – bass
Billy Osborne – drums

References

Black Saint/Soul Note albums
Anthony Braxton albums
1987 albums